Parafossarulus priscillae is an extinct species of freshwater snail with gills and an operculum, an aquatic prosobranch gastropod mollusk in the family Bithyniidae.

Glöer (2002) reassigned two European extinct species of Parafossarulus to a subgenus of the genus Bithynia, but the genus Parafossarulus is generally accepted for Asian species.

Distribution 
The (fossil) distribution of this species includes:
 Italy
 France
 the Netherlands
 England

References 

Bithyniidae
Pliocene gastropods
Pleistocene gastropods
Gastropods described in 1972